Allokepon is a genus of Isopoda parasites, in the family Bopyridae, containing the following species that can be found on the coasts of Asia and Africa:
Allokepon hendersoni Giard & Bonnier, 1888
Allokepon longicauda Duan, An & H. Yu, 2008
Allokepon monodi Bourdon, 1967
Allokepon sinensis Danforth, 1972
Allokepon tiariniae Shiino, 1937

References 

Cymothoida